The Tri-Cities Triplets were a Minor league baseball team that represented the cities of Muscle Shoals, Sheffield and Tuscumbia from Alabama. They played in the Alabama-Tennessee League in 1921.

References

External links
Baseball Reference

Baseball teams established in 1921
Defunct minor league baseball teams
Professional baseball teams in Alabama
Defunct Alabama-Tennessee League teams
Baseball teams disestablished in 1921
1921 establishments in Alabama
1921 disestablishments in Alabama
Defunct baseball teams in Alabama